() is a book by Nobel Prize-winning author Herta Müller. First published in 2001, the book's title was inspired by Jorge Semprún when he says in : "Basically language is not my Heimat, but that which is spoken."

Release details

References 

2001 German novels
Works by Herta Müller
German-language novels